The Promise Academy at Roberts Vaux High School (commonly referred to as 'Roberts Vaux Promise Academy) is a historic high school building located in the North Central neighborhood of Philadelphia, Pennsylvania.  It was designed by Irwin T. Catharine and built in 1936–1938.  It is a four-story, 23 bay, "U"-shaped yellow brick building in a Moderne / Art Deco-style.  It features projecting end pavilions, terra cotta decorative work, and a two-story stone Tudor-arched entryway.  It was named for American jurist, abolitionist, and philanthropist Roberts Vaux (1786-1836). Jacob C. White, Jr. served as principal from 1864 to 1896 and was the first black school principal in Philadelphia. During his tenure, White reformed the institute and became the leading figure in the field of urban education in Philadelphia.

It was added to the National Register of Historic Places in 1988.

The school was closed in 2013 as part of Philadelphia's shutdown of 23 district-run schools. Displaced students were enrolled in Strawberry Mansion High School and Benjamin Franklin High School.

Teaching at Vaux High in North Philadelphia, Larry Conlan saw a need for his students to positively channel their aggression. A rugby player himself, Conlan started an after-school club in 2012 for teenagers to play the sport. During the 1980s and 1990s, Vaux had developed a positive reputation for creating national and state chess champions. During the 1980s mathematics teacher Jeff Chesin was the coach for the team. After Chesin Vaux left for another school the chess team disbanded. In the 1990s, the chess program was resurrected by special education teacher and later principal Salome Thomas-El. In the early 2000s, the chess program disbanded again.  

Vaux, now operated by Big Picture Philadelphia, has reopened in the 2017–2018 academic year.

See also

References

School buildings on the National Register of Historic Places in Philadelphia
Moderne architecture in Pennsylvania
School buildings completed in 1938
North Central, Philadelphia